Phil Ryan (born 14 May 1951) is a retired Australian rules footballer who played with North Melbourne in the Victorian Football League (VFL) during the 1970s.

A utility, Ryan was recruited from Yarrawonga but also played some of his early football at Assumption College. He played from the forward pocket in North Melbourne's 1974 VFL Grand Final loss to Richmond. Ryan brought up his 100th league game with a win over South Melbourne in the final round of the 1975 season and retired a year later.

References

Holmesby, Russell and Main, Jim (2007). The Encyclopedia of AFL Footballers. 7th ed. Melbourne: Bas Publishing.

1951 births
Living people
Australian rules footballers from Victoria (Australia)
North Melbourne Football Club players
Yarrawonga Football Club players